The Bank of North Queensland was formed in 1887 in Townsville with branches in Sydney and London.

In 1893 there were branches in: Ayr, Cairns, Charters Towers, Cooktown, Herberton, Normanton, Rockhampton and Thursday Island and agencies at Mareeba, Limestone, and Muldiva. London agents, the London and Westminster Bank.  In 1910 it had branches in Northern, Central, and Southern Queensland, including Atherton, Childers and Warwick.  There were also branches in the New England area of New South Wales and the vicinity of Sydney, and Agencies throughout Australasia, Great Britain, America, and the East,

In 1917 the Bank of North Queensland merged with The Royal Bank of Queensland to form the Bank of Queensland

References

Banks established in 1887
Defunct banks of Australia
Economic history of Queensland
Australian companies established in 1887